Shahid Mohammad Rauf (also Romanized as Shahīd Moḩammad Ra’ūf; also known as Moḩammad Shāh-e ‘Olyā) is a village in Beygom Qaleh Rural District, in the Central District of Naqadeh County, West Azerbaijan Province, Iran. At the 2006 census, its population was 410, in 71 families.

References 

Populated places in Naqadeh County